The Brooklyn Dodgers was an American football team that played in the All-America Football Conference (AAFC) from 1946 to 1948. The team is unrelated to the Brooklyn Dodgers that played in the National Football League from 1930 to 1943.  The team folded prior to the 1949 season and was merged with the New York Yankees to form the Brooklyn-New York Yankees.

Team history
The Brooklyn Dodgers of the new AAFC held their first training camp in thesummer 1946 out west in central Oregon in the small town of Bend. Led by head coach Mal Stevens, some 62 members of the team assembled in Bend in the middle of July of that year. The team played two preseason games in the Pacific Northwest, the first in Portland against the Chicago Rockets at Multnomah Stadium on August 18, and the following Saturday night in Spokane against the New York Yankees at Gonzaga Stadium.

The star of the Dodgers was passing halfback Glenn Dobbs, an All-American at the University of Tulsa.

Season records

|-
| colspan="6" align="center" | Brooklyn Dodgers
|-
| 1946 || 3 || 10 || 1  || 2nd AAFC East || --
|-
| 1947 || 3 || 10 || 1  || 3rd AAFC East || --
|-
| 1948 || 2 || 12 || 0  || 4th AAFC East || --
|-
| colspan="6" align="center" | Brooklyn-New York Yankees
|-
| 1949 || 8 || 4 || 0 || 3rd AAFC || Lost Semi-Final
|-
!Totals || 16 || 36 || 2
|colspan="2"|

References

External links
databaseFootball: Brooklyn Dodgers statistics

 
Defunct American football teams in New York City
Sports in Brooklyn
1946 establishments in New York (state)
1949 disestablishments in New York (state)
American football teams established in 1946
American football teams disestablished in 1949